The LT&SR 49 class was a class of 0-6-0 steam locomotives.  They were the only tender engines used by the London, Tilbury and Southend Railway.  They were originally ordered by the Ottoman Railway in Turkey, however that order was cancelled after they had been built and instead they were sold to the LT&SR in 1898.  The LT&SR numbered them 49 and 50.

Both passed to the Midland Railway when it merged the LT&SR in 1912.  The Midland renumbered them 2898–2899 and gave them the power classification 2F.  The Midland fitted them with Belpaire firebox boilers, plus some standard fittings.  Both passed into LMS ownership in 1923, and they initially retained their numbers.

In 1935, number 2899 was renumbered with the addition of 20000 to 22899; 2898 having been withdrawn in 1933. Number 22899 was withdrawn in 1936.  Neither was preserved.

References 
 
 Bob Essery The London, Tilbury and Southend Railway and its Locomotives, OPC (2001) 
 Bob Essery and David Jenkinson An Illustrated History of LMS locomotives. Volume 4. Absorbed Pre-Group Classes Midland Division 

49
0-6-0 locomotives
Railway locomotives introduced in 1898
Standard gauge steam locomotives of Great Britain
Scrapped locomotives